Cegavske is a surname. Notable people with the surname include:

Barbara Cegavske (born 1951), American businesswoman and politician
Christiane Cegavske (born 1971), American artist and stop motion animator